Edward Warren may refer to:

 Edward A. Warren (1818–1875), U.S. Representative from Arkansas
 Edward Prioleau Warren (1856–1937), British architect and archaeologist
 Edward Perry Warren (1860–1928), known as Ned Warren, American art collector and writer
 Edward Kirk Warren (1847–1919), American businessman and inventor; namesake of Warren Dunes State Park
 Edward Warren (politician) (1897–1983), Australian politician
 Edward Warren (MP), Member of Parliament (MP) for Liverpool
 Edward Warren (priest), Irish Anglican dean
 Edward Royal Warren (1860–1942), American naturalist and engineer
 Ted Warren (Edward John Warren), Australian politician
 Edward Delon Warren (1953–2003), American serial killer and criminal
 E. Alyn Warren (1874–1940), American actor